Kenan Thompson (born May 10, 1978) is an American actor and comedian. He has been a cast member of the NBC sketch comedy series Saturday Night Live since 2003, making him the longest-tenured cast member in the show's history. He was also the first regular cast member born after the show's premiere in 1975. He starred on the NBC sitcom Kenan (2021–2022).

Thompson began his acting career in the early 1990s, and was an original cast member of Nickelodeon's sketch comedy series All That, where he often collaborated with co-star Kel Mitchell. In 1996, they began starring in their own sitcom Kenan & Kel (1996–2000). Thompson also had roles in The Mighty Ducks franchise, Good Burger, and as the title character in the 2004 film Fat Albert.

He has been nominated five times for a Primetime Emmy Award for his work on SNL, winning once. He is ranked at No. 88 on VH1's 100 Greatest Teen Stars.

Early life
Thompson was born on May 10, 1978 in Columbus, Ohio. His parents are Fletcher and Elizabeth Ann Thompson. He has two siblings: an older brother and a younger sister. His family moved to Atlanta, Georgia, when he was 9 months old. Thompson's mother enrolled him in acting classes at age five. His first role as Toto in a church production of The Wiz had no lines. He continued acting throughout his youth, appearing in school plays such as The Gingerbread Duck. He auditioned for a theater company, The Youth Ensemble of Atlanta (YEA). As a child, he was a fan of The Price Is Right, which he has called "my first love" and "very joyful viewing" that shaped his acting style.

Career

Early career
One of Thompson's earliest roles was as an entertainment reporter for CNN's "Real News for Kids". He went on to star in the original run of All That for its first five seasons, playing such characters as Principal Pimpell, Miss Piddlin, Pierre Escargot, and Superdude. He starred as Kenan Rockmore on Nickelodeon's Kenan & Kel from 1996 to 2000, mostly while still working on All That. He began acting in his first movie, D2: The Mighty Ducks, while attending Tri-Cities High School, a visual and performing arts magnet school in East Point, Georgia.

Later career

Thompson has starred in several films including Good Burger, based on the All That sketch of the same title, and Fat Albert, in which he played the title character. He has also had supporting roles in the movies Heavyweights, D2: The Mighty Ducks, D3: The Mighty Ducks, Love Don't Cost a Thing, Barbershop 2: Back in Business, My Boss's Daughter, and Snakes on a Plane.

In 2009, Thompson was a regular voice actor in the Fox cartoon series Sit Down, Shut Up, portraying Sue Sezno who, like her last name, always says no. The series premiered on April 19, 2009, but was canceled after only four episodes due to low ratings and poor reviews. Thompson voiced the LeBron James puppet in Nike's MVP "Most Valuable Puppets" commercials, which were produced to be shown throughout the 2009 NBA playoffs. Thompson also guest-starred as Gus's estranged college singing buddy on the USA Network series Psych in the fourth-season episode "High Top Fade Out". In 2011, he returned to Nickelodeon, guest-starring in "iParty with Victorious", a crossover episode of sitcoms iCarly and Victorious.

Thompson appeared as a host of sorts of TeenNick's retro programming block, The '90s Are All That, appearing in many of the block's early bumpers and hyping material. He would return to the block, eventually called NickRewind but at the time called The Splat, for All Thats 22nd anniversary, with segments filmed at the 2015 New York Comic-Con.

In 2015, movie ticketing website Fandango announced that Thompson would play their brand character, Miles Mouvay. Thompson would play Mouvay in 18 videos, eight 30-second commercials, and a few comedic skits.

On September 23, 2015, Thompson appeared on The Tonight Show Starring Jimmy Fallon alongside former All That co-star Kel Mitchell in which they reprised their popular Good Burger roles as "Ed" and "Lester Oakes, Construction Worker". They later competed against one another in an episode of the revived Nickelodeon game show Double Dare that aired in November 2018.

In 2019, Thompson served as a judge for NBC's comedy competition series Bring the Funny. He also became an executive producer with Mitchell for Nickelodeon's All That revival, premiering in June. In May 2019, NBC announced they had picked up Thompson's single-camera comedy The Kenan Show to series. The series, retitled Kenan, premiered in 2021 on NBC, featuring Thompson as a newly-widowed father determined to be a "super dad". He was nominated for the Primetime Emmy Award for Outstanding Lead Actor in a Comedy Series after its first season. In May 2022, the series was canceled after its second season.

In 2020, he became the spokesman for Universal Destinations & Experiences’ "Let Yourself Woah" campaign, and was set to host the 2020 White House Correspondents' Dinner before it was cancelled due to the COVID-19 pandemic.

2021 would also see Thompson be named host of that year's Nickelodeon Kids' Choice Awards and People's Choice Awards. He also hosted The Jonas Brothers Family Roast on Netflix.

In December 2021, Thompson co-founded the production company and talent incubator Artists for Artists (AFA). Their first announced project, Mike Tyson: Undisputed Truth Part 2 is in collaboration with Mike Tyson and wife Lakiha "Kiki" Spicer and a sequel to the boxer's 2013 HBO special. In March 2022, AFA fully funded the launch of Twenty Two Entertainment, led by actors Michael Rainey Jr. and Gianni Paolo, best known from the Starz series Power Book II: Ghost.

He appears in the third episode of the revival of The Kids in the Hall as Ron, a Friend of the Kids in the Hall and hosted the NHL Awards in June 2022.

He hosted the 74th Primetime Emmy Awards on September 12, 2022.

Saturday Night Live

Thompson returned to sketch comedy when he joined the cast of Saturday Night Live in 2003, becoming the show's first cast member born after its 1975 premiere. Thompson said he had sent several audition tapes to SNL, which dismissed him as looking too young; he said "it was a couple years' worth of that". Thompson said that he feared his addition to the cast would be a "disservice" to the show: "It was weird for me for a long time". Thompson was a featured player until 2005 (spanning the 29th and 30th seasons) and was promoted to repertory player at the beginning of season 31 (the 2005–2006 season).

In 2013, he refused to play any more black women on the show and demanded SNL hire black women instead.

Thompson has been a cast member on SNL for 20 seasons, breaking the record for the longest-tenured cast member in the show's history previously held by Darrell Hammond, who was on the show for 14 years. Thompson became the most senior cast member in the second half of the 2013–14 season, following the departure of Seth Meyers. He is also the longest-serving African-American cast member, surpassing Tim Meadows, who stayed on the show for ten seasons. Thompson also holds the record for most celebrity impressions performed on the show, performing 139, beating Hammond's previous record of 107. Although early on he planned to stay on the show until something else came along, by 2019 he noted that SNL was his "forever plan".

Thompson has been nominated for five Primetime Emmys for his work on SNL, winning once. He has thrice been nominated for Outstanding Supporting Actor in a Comedy Series, in 2018, 2020 and 2021. For co-writing the song "Last Christmas", in 2017 he was nominated for Outstanding Original Music and Lyrics, an award he then won in 2018 for the lyrics to "Come Back Barack" (along with Chris Redd and Will Stephen).

In 2014, SNL head writer Brian H. Tucker noted that simply putting "KENAN REACTS" would get a script more laughs, further elaborating, "Put him in your sketch somewhere, anywhere, and your sketch will get better. Because Kenan knows how to take ordinary lines and make them funny, and take funny lines and make them special." Similarly, Lorne Michaels in a 2019 article referred to Thompson as "the person I most rely on in the cast". Vulture referred to him as the "heir apparent" to Phil Hartman, both being "the glue" of their respective casts.

Thompson's celebrity impressions on SNL include Al Sharpton, Whoopi Goldberg, Bill Cosby, Charles Barkley, David Ortiz, OJ Simpson, and Steve Harvey.

He has performed in over 1,500 sketches, hitting the mark during the March 5, 2022 episode hosted by Oscar Isaac.

In commemoration of his 20th anniversary on the show, Thompson received a star on the Hollywood Walk of Fame on August 11, 2022. It was placed next to Lorne Michaels' star.

Recurring characters 

 Darnell Hayes, the host of Black Jeopardy!
 Diondre Cole, the host of What Up with That? (What's Up with That? in some episodes), who is repeatedly distracted by the show's theme song
 Reese De'What, the host of Cinema Classics
 Willie, Michael Che's overly optimistic neighbour
 Jean K. Jean, a French comedian
 Lorenzo McIntosh, a prisoner in the Scared Straight sketches
 Steve Kane, the gym teacher in the Daniel Frye sketches
 Tre, a character in the Californians sketches
 Virginiaca Hastings, an argumentative shopper
 Elliot Pants, Host of What's Wrong with This Picture?

Personal life
Thompson married model Christina Evangeline on November 11, 2011. Together, they have two daughters, born in June 2014, and August 2018.

On April 7, 2022, it was announced that the two had been separated for over a year, and are co-parenting their daughters. On June 15, 2022, it was announced that Thompson was officially filing for divorce.

Filmography

 Thompson stood in for Simon Cowell, who was still recovering from a back injury the previous week that required him to rest under medical observation.

References

External links

 
 

1978 births
Living people
20th-century American comedians
20th-century American male actors
21st-century American comedians
21st-century American male actors
African-American male actors
African-American male comedians
American impressionists (entertainers)
American male child actors
American male comedians
American male film actors
American male television actors
American male voice actors
American sketch comedians
Male actors from Atlanta
Musicians from Atlanta
Primetime Emmy Award winners
Santa Monica College alumni
20th-century African-American people
21st-century African-American people
Disney people
Nickelodeon people